Micko is a documentary about Mick O'Dwyer.

It first aired on RTÉ One on 8 January 2018. Loosehorse were responsible for putting it together.

O'Dwyer described Eoin Liston as "a great man for the Mars bars and a packet of Smarties."

O'Dwyer was 81 at the time Micko aired.

References

External links
 "10 things we learned from 'Micko'"

2018 in Gaelic football
2018 in Irish television
Documentary films about Gaelic games
Documentary films about sportspeople
Gaelic games on television
Irish documentary television films
Kerry county football team
Sports television in Ireland